Pangsha is an upazila of Rajbari District in the Division of Dhaka, Bangladesh.

Geography
It has 54,424 households and a total area of 414.24 km2.

Demographics

According to the 1991 Bangladesh census, Pangsha had a population of 316,752, of whom 151,566 were aged 18 or older. Males constituted 51.78% of the population, and females 48.22%. Pangsha had an average literacy rate of 23.1% (7+ years), against the national average of 32.4%. mashhpara 23.75/89.36.
Bagduli High School. Pangsha Rajbari Maurat latitude 23.47 longitude89,25

Administration
Pangsha Upazila is divided into Pangsha Municipality and ten union parishads: Babupara, Bahadurpur, Habashpur, Jashai, Kalimahar, Kasbamajhail, Machhpara, Mourat, Patta, and Sarisha. The union parishads are subdivided into 162 mauzas and 192 villages.

Pangsha Municipality is subdivided into 9 wards and 21 mahallas.

Notable people 
Kaushik Ali Chowdhury, Bengali essayist
Rowshan Ali Chowdhury, journalist

Gallery

See also
Upazilas of Bangladesh
Districts of Bangladesh
Divisions of Bangladesh

References

Upazilas of Rajbari District